Jens Harald Christensen (4 January 1884 – 8 August 1959) was a Greco-Roman wrestler from Denmark. He won a world title in 1907, placing third in 1908 and 1910. He also held European titles in 1909 and 1911. He competed at the 1908 and 1912 Summer Olympics, but finished outside the podium.

Domestically Christensen held the Danish middleweight title in 1907–14. In 1909 he turned professional, and in 1915 immigrated to the United States where he worked as a wrestling and swimming coach at the University of Iowa. There he was known under the name Harold Mike Howard.

References

External links
 

1884 births
1959 deaths
Olympic wrestlers of Denmark
Wrestlers at the 1908 Summer Olympics
Wrestlers at the 1912 Summer Olympics
Danish male sport wrestlers
Sportspeople from Copenhagen
World Wrestling Champions
20th-century Danish people